Looking Beyond is a US non-profit organization dedicated to promoting awareness and enriching the lives of children and young adults with special needs. Looking Beyond supports various organisations, programs and services with money collected through events and fundraising opportunities. It was established in 1999 by twelve women from Los Angeles. Since then, they organise yearly Gala dinners, and distribute the funds among tens of organizations, programs and hospitals.

Beneficiaries 
In 2018, Looking Beyond has disbursed more than $300,000 to 30 organizations, including United Cerebral Palsy LA, No Limit Theater Group for Deaf Children, Children's Hospital Orthopaedic Department, ILAI Fund.

Soaring Spirit Award 
Every year during its yearly charity Gala, Looking Beyond presents The Soaring Spirit Award to individuals who have broken through personal barriers, and serving as inspiration to others. In 2018, the Soaring Spirit Award was awarded to USC junior long snapper Jake Olson, who, despite eye cancer that cost him an eye at the age of 12, has accomplished his dream of playing football for his college. He has also written two books, and established his own foundation.

Scholarship 
In 2014, Looking Beyond established a special scholarship fund to provide tuition assistance to undergraduate USC Price School of Public Policy students with learning disabilities, such as attention deficit hyperactivity disorder, dyslexia, or auditory or visual processing problems. The program is called USC LB Scholarship, and has contributed close to $30,000 in 2018.

Awards 
In 2018, the ILAI Fund, one of its repeat beneficiaries, awarded Looking Beyond LA with the Annual Best Donating Angel Award.

References
 

 

Non-profit organizations based in Los Angeles
Organizations established in 1999
1999 establishments in California
Disability organizations based in the United States